Marasmarcha is a genus of moths in the family Pterophoridae erected by Ernst Arenberger in 1991.

Species

Marasmarcha asiatica (Rebel, 1906)
Marasmarcha bajanica Fazekas, 2003
Marasmarcha bonaespei (Walsingham, 1881)
 (=Marasmarcha verax (Meyrick, 1909))
Marasmarcha brevirostris Walsingham, 1915
Marasmarcha cinnamomeus (Staudinger, 1870)
Marasmarcha colossa Caradja, 1920
Marasmarcha corniculata (Meyrick, 1913)
Marasmarcha ehrenbergianus (Zeller, 1841)
Marasmarcha empedota (Meyrick, 1908)
Marasmarcha fauna (Millière, 1871)
Marasmarcha iranica Arenberger, 1999
Marasmarcha lunaedactyla (Haworth, 1811)
Marasmarcha lydia Ustjuzhanin, 1996
Marasmarcha oxydactylus (Staudinger, 1859)
Marasmarcha picardi Gibeaux, 1990
Marasmarcha pulcher (Christoph, 1885)
Marasmarcha rhypodactylus (Staudinger, 1870)
Marasmarcha samarcandica Gerasimov, 1930
Marasmarcha sisyrodes Meyrick, 1921
Marasmarcha spinosa Meyrick, 1925
Marasmarcha tugaicola Zagulajev, 1986

Exelastini
Moth genera